The Union for Democracy and Social Progress  is a political party in Togo. It is currently led by Gagou Kokou.

In the parliamentary election held on 27 October 2002, the party won 2 out of 81 seats.

The UDPS participated in the October 2007 parliamentary election, but did not win any seats in the National Assembly.

References

Political parties in Togo